John of Denmark may refer to:
John, King of Denmark (1455–1513)
John of Denmark (1518–1532)
John II, Duke of Schleswig-Holstein-Haderslev (1521–1580)
John II, Duke of Schleswig-Holstein-Sonderburg (1545–1622)
John, Prince of Schleswig-Holstein (1583–1602)